Aimery of Lusignan (Amorí; before 11551 April 1205), erroneously referred to as Amalric or Amaury in earlier scholarship, was the first King of Cyprus, reigning from 1196 to his death. He also reigned as the King of Jerusalem from his marriage to Isabella I in 1197 to his death. He was a younger son of Hugh VIII of Lusignan, a nobleman in Poitou. After participating in a rebellion against Henry II of England in 1168, he went to the Holy Land and settled in the Kingdom of Jerusalem.

His marriage to Eschiva of Ibelin (whose father was an influential nobleman) strengthened his position in the kingdom. His younger brother, Guy, married Sibylla, the sister of and heir presumptive to Baldwin IV of Jerusalem. Baldwin made Aimery the constable of Jerusalem at around 1180. He was one of the commanders of the Christian army in the Battle of Hattin, which ended with decisive defeat at the hands of the army of Saladin, the Ayyubid sultan of Egypt and Syria, on 4 July 1187.

Aimery supported Guy even after he lost his claim to the Kingdom of Jerusalem according to most barons of the realm, because of the death of Sibylla and their two daughters. The new King of Jerusalem, Henry II of Champagne, arrested Aimery for a short period. After his release, he retired to Jaffa which was the fief of his elder brother, Geoffrey of Lusignan, who had left the Holy Land.

After Guy died in May 1194, his vassals in Cyprus elected Aimery as their lord. He accepted the suzerainty of the Holy Roman emperor, Henry VI. With the emperor's authorization, Aimery was crowned King of Cyprus in September 1197. He soon married Henry of Champagne's widow, Isabella I of Jerusalem. He and his wife were crowned King and Queen of Jerusalem in January 1198. He signed a truce with Al-Adil I, the Ayyubid sultan of Egypt, which secured the Christian possession of the coastline from Acre to Antioch. His rule was a period of peace and stability in both of his realms.

Early life 

Aimery was born before 1155. He was the fifth son of Hugh VIII of Lusignan and his wife, Burgundia of Rancon. His family had been noted for generations of crusaders in their native Poitou. His great-grandfather, Hugh VI of Lusignan, died in the Battle of Ramla in 1102; Aimery's grandfather, Hugh VII of Lusignan, took part in the Second Crusade. Aimery's father also came to the Holy Land and died in a Muslim prison in the 1160s. Earlier scholarship erroneously referred to him as Amalric (or Amaury, its French form), but evidences from documentaries shows he was actually called Aimericus, which is a distinct name (although it was sometimes confused with Amalricus already in the Middle Ages). Runciman and other modern historians erroneously refer to him as Amalric II of Jerusalem, because they confused his name with that of Amalric "I" of Jerusalem.

Aimery joined a rebellion against Henry II of England (who also ruled Poitou) in 1168, according to Robert of Torigni's chronicle, but Henry crushed the rebellion. Aimery left for the Holy Land and settled in the Kingdom of Jerusalem. He was captured in a battle and held in captivity in Damascus. A popular tradition (which was first recorded by the 13th-century Philip of Novara and John of Ibelin) held, the King of Jerusalem, Amalric, ransomed him personally.

Ernoul (whose reliability is questioned) claimed Aimery was a lover of Amalric of Jerusalem's former wife, Agnes of Courtenay. Aimery married Eschiva of Ibelin, a daughter of Baldwin of Ibelin, who was one of the most powerful noblemen in the Kingdom of Jerusalem. Amalric of Jerusalem, who died on 11 July 1174, was succeeded by his thirteen-year-old son by Agnes of Courtenay, Baldwin IV who suffered from leprosy. Aimery became a member of the royal court with his father-in-law's support.

Aimery's youngest brother, Guy, married Baldwin IV's widowed sister, Sibylla, in April 1180. Ernoul wrote, it was Aimery who had spoken of his brother to her and her mother, Agnes of Courtenay, describing him as a handsome and charming young man. Aimery, continued Ernoul, hurried back to Poitou and persuaded Guy to come to the kingdom, although Sibylla had promised herself to Aimery's father-in-law. Another source, William of Tyre, did not mention that Aimery had played any role in the marriage of his brother and the King's sister. Consequently, many elements of Ernoul's report (especially Aimery's alleged journey to Poitou) were most probably invented.

Constable of Jerusalem 

Aimery was first mentioned as Constable of Jerusalem on 24 February 1182. According to Steven Runciman and Malcolm Barber, he had already been granted the office shortly after his predecessor, Humphrey II of Toron, died in April 1179. Historian Bernard Hamilton writes that Aimery's appointment was the consequence of the growing influence of his brother and he was appointed only around 1181.

Saladin, the Ayyubid sultan of Egypt and Syria, launched a campaign against the Kingdom of Jerusalem on 29 September 1183. Aimery defeated the sultan's troops in a minor skirmish with the support of his father-in-law and his brother, Balian of Ibelin. After the victory, the crusaders' main army could advance as far as a spring near Saladin's camp, forcing him to retreat nine days later. During the campaign, it turned out that most barons of the realm were unwilling to cooperate with Aimery's brother, Guy, who was the designated heir to Baldwin IV. The ailing King dismissed Guy and made his five-year-old nephew (Guy's stepson), Baldwin V, his co-ruler on 20 November 1183.

In early 1185, Baldwin IV decreed that the Pope, the Holy Roman Emperor and the Kings of France and England were to be approached to choose between his sister, Sybilla, and their half-sister, Isabella, if Baldwin V died before reaching the age of majority. The leper King died in April or May 1185, his nephew in late summer of 1186. Ignoring Baldwin IV's decree, Sybilla was proclaimed queen by her supporters and she crowned her husband, Guy, king. Aimery was not listed among those who were present at the ceremony, but he obviously supported his brother and sister-in-law, according to Hamilton.

As Constable, Aimery organised the army of the Kingdom of Jerusalem into units before the Battle of Hattin, which ended with the decisive victory of Saladin on 4 July 1187. Along with most commanders of the Christian army, Aimery was captured in the battlefield. During the siege of Ascalon, Saladin promised the defenders that he would set free ten persons whom they named if they surrendered. Aimery and Guy were among those whom the defenders named before surrendering on 4 September, but Saladin postponed their release until the spring of 1188.

Most barons of the realm thought that Guy lost his claim to the Kingdom of Jerusalem when Sybilla and their two daughters died in late 1190, but Aimery remained loyal to his brother. Guy's opponents supported Conrad of Montferrat who married Sybilla's half-sister, Isabella in late November. An assembly of the noblemen of the realm unanimously declared Conrad the lawful king on 16 April 1192. Although Conrad was murdered twelve days later, his widow soon married Henry of Champagne, who was elected King of Jerusalem. To compensate Guy for the loss of Jerusalem, Richard I of England authorized him to purchase the island of Cyprus (that Richard had conquered in May 1191) from the Knights Templar. He was also to pay 40,000 bezants to Richard who donated the right to collect the sum from Guy to Henry of Champagne. Guy settled in Cyprus in early May.

Aimery remained in the Kingdom of Jerusalem, which was reduced to a narrow strip of land along the coast of the Mediterranean Sea from Jaffa to Tyre. Henry of Champagne ordered the expulsion of the merchants from Pisa from Acre in May, because he accused them of plotting with Guy of Lusignan. After Aimery intervened on behalf of the merchants, the King had him arrested. Aimery was only released at the demand of the grand masters of the Templars and the Hospitallers. He retired to Jaffa that Richard of England had granted to Aimery's eldest brother, Geoffrey of Lusignan.

Reign

Lord of Cyprus 

Guy died in May 1194, and bequeathed Cyprus to his elder brother, Geoffrey. However Geoffrey had already returned to Poitou, thus Guy's vassals elected Aimery their new lord. Henry of Champagne demanded the right to be consulted about the succession in Cyprus, but the Cypriote noblemen ignored him. Around the same time, Henry of Champagne replaced Aimery with John of Ibelin as constable of Jerusalem.

Aimery realized that the treasury of Cyprus was almost empty, because his brother had granted most landed property in the island to his supporters, according to Ernoul. He summoned his vassals to an assembly. After emphasizing that each of them owned more land than he had, he persuaded them one by one "either by force, or by friendship, or by agreement" to surrender some their rents and lands.

Aimery dispatched an embassy to Pope Celestine III, asking him to set up Roman Catholic dioceses in Cyprus. He also sent his representative, Rainier of Gibelet, to the Holy Roman Emperor, Henry VI, proposing that he would acknowledge the emperor's suzerainty, if the emperor sent a royal crown to him. Aimery primarily wanted to secure the emperor's assistance against a potential Byzantine invasion of Cyprus, but he also wanted to strengthen his own legitimacy as king. Rainier of Gibelet swore loyalty to Henry VI on behalf of Aimery in Gelnhausen in October 1196. The emperor who had decided to lead a crusade to the Holy Land promised that he would personally crown Aimery king. He dispatched the archbishops of Brindisi and Trani to take a golden sceptre to Aimery as a symbol of his right to rule Cyprus.

King of Cyprus 

Henry VI's two envoys landed in Cyprus in April or May 1196. Aimery may have adopted the title of king around that time, because Pope Celestin styled him as king already in a letter in December 1196. In the same month, the Pope set up a Roman Catholic archdiocese in Nicosia with three suffragan bishops in Famagusta, Limassol and Paphos. The Greek Orthodox bishops were not expelled, but their property and income was seized by the new Catholic prelates.

Henry VI's chancellor, Conrad, Bishop of Hildesheim, crowned Aimery king in Nicosia in September 1197. Aimery did homage to the chancellor. The noblemen who owned fiefs in both Cyprus and the Kingdom of Jerusalem wanted to bring about a reconciliation between Aimery and Henry of Champagne. One of them, Baldwin of Beisan, Constable of Cyprus, persuaded Henry of Champage to visit Cyprus in early 1197. The two kings made peace, agreeing that Aimery's three sons were to marry Henry's three daughters. Henry also renounced the debt that Aimery still owed to him for Cyprus and allowed Aimery to garrison his troops at Jaffa. Aimery sent Reynald Barlais to take possession of Jaffa. Aimery again used the title of Constable of Jerusalem in November 1197, which suggests that he had also recovered that office as a consequence of his treaty with Henry of Champagne.

King of two realms 

Henry of Champagne fell from the window in his palace and died in Acre on 10 September 1197. The aristocratic-yet-impoverished Raoul of Saint Omer was one of the possible candidates to succeed him, but the grand masters of the military orders opposed him vehemently. A few days later, Al-Adil I, the Ayyubid sultan of Egypt, occupied Jaffa.

Conrad of Wittelsbach, Archbishop of Mainz, who arrived to Acre on 20 September, was the first to propose that the crown should be offered to Aimery. Since Aimery's first wife had died, he could marry the widowed Isabella I of Jerusalem, who was the queen. Although Aymar, Patriarch of Jerusalem, stated that the marriage would be uncanonical, Joscius, Archbishop of Tyre, started negotiations with Aimery who accepted the offer. The patriarch also withdrew his objections and crowned Aimery and Isabella king and queen in Tyre in January 1198.

The Cypriot Army fought for the Kingdom of Jerusalem during Aimery's rule, but otherwise he administered his two realms separately. Even before his coronation, Aimery united his forces with the German crusaders who were under the command of Duke Henry I of Brabant to launch a campaign against the Ayyubid troops. They forced Al-Adil to withdraw and captured Beirut on 21 October. He laid siege to Toron, but he had to lift the siege on 2 February, because the German crusaders decided to return to the Holy Roman Empire after learning that Emperor Henry VI had died.

Aimery was riding at Tyre when four German knights attacked him in March 1198. His retainers rescued him and captured the four knights. Aimery accused Raoul of Saint Omer of hiring the assailants and sentenced him to banishment without a trial by his peers. At Raoul's demand, the case was submitted to the High Court of Jerusalem which held that Aimery had unlawfully banished Raoul. Nevertheless, Raoul voluntarily left the kingdom and settled in Tripoli, because he knew that he had lost Aimery's goodwill.

Aimery signed a truce with Al-Adil on 1 July 1198, securing the possession of the coast from Acre as far as to Antioch for the crusaders for five years and eight months. The Byzantine emperor, Alexios III Angelos, did not abandon the idea of recovering Cyprus. He promised that he would help a new crusade if Pope Innocent III excommunicated Aimery to enable a Byzantine invasion in 1201, but Innocent refused him, stating that the Byzantines had lost their right to Cyprus when Richard I conquered the island in 1191.

Aimery kept the peace with the Muslims, even when Reynald II of Dampierre, who arrived at the head of 300 French crusaders, demanded that he launch a campaign against the Muslims in early 1202. After Aimery reminded him that more than 300 soldiers were needed to wage war against the Ayyubids, Reynald left the Kingdom of Jerusalem for the Principality of Antioch. An Egyptian emir seized a fortress near Sidon and made plundering raids against the neighboring territory. As Al-Adil failed to force the emir to respect the truce, Aimery's fleet seized 20 Egyptian ships and he invaded Al-Adil's realm. In retaliation, Al-Adil's son, Al-Mu'azzam Isa plundered the region of Acre. In May 1204, Aimery's fleet sacked a small town in the Nile Delta in Egypt. The envoys of Aimery and Al-Adil signed a new truce for six years in September 1204. Al-Adil ceded Jaffa and Ramleh to the Kingdom of Jerusalem and simplified the Christian pilgrims' visits in Jerusalem and Nazareth.

After eating an excess of white mullet, Aimery fell seriously ill. He died after a short illness on 1 April 1205. His six-year-old son, Hugh I, succeeded him in Cyprus; and his widow ruled the Kingdom of Jerusalem until her own death four days later.

Legacy 

Historian Mary Nickerson Hardwicke described Aimery as a "self-assured, politically astute, sometimes hard, seldom sentimentally indulgent" ruler. His rule was a period of peace and consolidation. He initiated the revision of the laws of the Kingdom of Jerusalem to specify royal prerogatives. The lawyers of the Kingdom of Jerusalem held him in high esteem. One of them, John of Ibelin emphasized that Aimery had governed both Cyprus and Jerusalem "well and wisely" until his death.

Family 

Aimery's first wife, Eschiva of Ibelin, was the elder daughter of Baldwin of Ibelin, Lord of Mirabel and Ramleh, and Richelda of Beisan. They had five children
Bourgogne, who married (1) Raymond VI of Toulouse in 1193 (div 1196 with no issue); (2) Walter of Montbéliard in 1204. Walter was the regent of Cyprus for her younger brother, Hugh I, from 1205 to 1210. 
Helvis, who was the wife of Raymond-Roupen, who was Prince of Antioch from 1216 to 1219. 
Guy, who died young
John, who died young
Hugh I, who married Alice of Champagne

Aimery's second wife, Isabella I of Jerusalem, was the only daughter of Amalric I of Jerusalem and Maria Komnene. They had three children 
Sybilla, who was the second wife of Leo I, King of Armenia. 
Melisende, who married Bohemond IV of Antioch. 
Amalric, who died during childhood, 2 February 1205.

References

Sources

Further reading 
 

|-

|-

|-

12th-century births
1205 deaths
12th-century kings of Jerusalem
13th-century kings of Jerusalem
Kings of Jerusalem
Kings of Cyprus
Jure uxoris kings
Burials at Saint Sophia Cathedral, Nicosia
French Roman Catholics
Christians of the Crusade of 1197